The Bowler Nemesis is an off-road racing vehicle designed, manufactured and sold by Bowler Off Road. The Nemesis is intended to be used in endurance rally raid events such as the Dakar Rally and Rallye des Pharaons.

Design and construction
The Nemesis takes styling elements such as grille, headlights and rear lights from the Range Rover Sport. Like the Bowler Wildcat that preceded it, the Nemesis has a tubular steel spaceframe construction that incorporates a roll cage as an integral part of the frame structure. The spaceframe and roll cage are approved by the Motor Sports Association for racing. Unlike the Wildcat, the Nemesis features a fully independent suspension design.

Bowler offers the Nemesis with 4.0 or 4.4-litre displacement naturally aspirated V8 or a 4.2-litre displacement supercharged V8. A six speed manual transmission is fitted as standard with the option of a dog engagement racing transmission. The vehicle features a 60/40 torque split  limited slip center differential with over-lock and limited slip front and rear differentials.

Body panels are made of a composite material called Twin-tex with some carbon fibre pieces in areas where higher strength is required.
	
The Nemesis has a 415-litre capacity racing fuel cell to allow the vehicle to run the longest Dakar Rally stages.

Bowler EXR-S

In popular culture 
The Bowler EXR-S is featured in the mobile racing game Smash Bandits Racing as a tier 5 car, and in the Forza racing game franchise as an extreme off-road vehicle.
It is also used in the popular game "Blur" as an off-road vehicle.

References

Off-road vehicles